Carbon capture may refer to:
 Carbon capture and utilization, where the captured carbon dioxide is used
 Carbon sequestration, where the captured carbon dioxide is stored
 Carbon capture and storage, referring to carbon sequestration from point sources
 Carbon dioxide removal, referring to carbon sequestration from the atmosphere
 Direct air capture, where carbon dioxide is captured directly from air